Frigates, which are naval vessels intermediate between corvettes and destroyers, have had a significant role in the naval history of India. Although the Maratha Navy, the naval branch of the armed forces of the Maratha Empire, used Grabs and Gallivats to project naval power, the concept of frigates (formerly called sloops) was introduced by the British. These ships later served in the Second World War.

The RIN was expanded significantly during the Second World War. Several frigates of the River class were also commissioned. Some of them were later transferred to Pakistan during partition.

The Nilgiri-class frigates were the first major warships to be built in India, in association with Yarrow Shipbuilders of the United Kingdom. , 12 guided-missile frigates from three different classes –  , Talwar, and  – are operated by the Indian Navy.

Ships currently in commission
The  is the largest of the frigate classes presently in service .  is the lead ship of the class and the first stealth warship built by India. All three ships of this class were built by Mazagon Dock Limited in Mumbai, from 2000 to 2010. With their improved stealth features and land-attack capabilities, the Shivalik-class warships were originally conceived as successors to the six s, which are modified Krivak III-class vessels built by Russia for the Indian Navy. The Talwar class was preceded by the s, which were built by the Garden Reach Shipbuilders and Engineers in Kolkata. Three ships of this class are still in service with the Indian Navy.

Shivalik class
The Shivalik class, or Project 17 class, is a class of multi-role frigates in service with the Indian Navy. They are the first stealth warships built in India. A total of three ships were built between 2000 and 2010, and all three were in commission by 2012. The Shivalik class, along with the seven Project 17A frigates being developed from them , are projected to be the principal frigates of the Indian Navy in the first half of the 21st century. All ships of the class were built by Mazagon Dock Limited. The class and the ships are named after hill ranges in India. Originally conceived as a successor to the Talwar-class frigates, the Shivalik-class frigates feature improved stealth features and land-attack capabilities.

Talwar class
The Talwar class, also known as Project 1135.6, is a class of guided-missile frigates designed and built by Russia for the Indian Navy, as modified Krivak III-class frigates (the class that is also the basis of the Russian ), with a number of systems of Indian design and manufacture, including anti-submarine sensors (sonar) and communications equipment. Due to the use of stealth technologies and a special hull design, the frigate operates with reduced radar cross section (RCS), as well as reduced electromagnetic, acoustic, and infrared signatures.

Brahmaputra class
The Brahmaputra-class frigates (Type 16A or Project 16A) are guided-missile frigates of the Indian Navy, designed and built in India. They are an enhancement of the Godavari class, with the same displacement, 3850 tons, and length, but with different configuration, armaments, and capabilities. Three ships of this class serve in the Indian Navy. The class and the ships, are named for Indian rivers.

Decommissioned ships
Most of the decommissioned frigates or sloops of the Indian Navy originated in the United Kingdom.

Sloops
A modern British sloop-of-war is a warship used for convoy defence. These ships were also the first ships to be decommissioned. The other sloops were subsequently scrapped after their decommissioning.

The twenty-eight Anchusa-class sloops were a small class of corvettes or convoy sloops built in 1917 and 1918 under the Emergency War Programme for the Royal Navy in the First World War, as the final part of the larger "Flower class" (which were also referred to as the "cabbage class", or "herbaceous borders"). The sloops were single-screw with triple hulls at the bows to give extra protection against loss when working as fleet sweeping vessels, or as convoy protection ships (the class was built to look like merchant ships for use as Q-ships). HMS Ceanothus (1917) (later renamed as HMS Elphinstone), transferred to the Royal Indian Marine in 1922, was the only Anchusa-class sloop used by India.

The Aubrietia class was a class of twelve sloops built under the Emergency War Programme for the Royal Navy in the First World War as part of the larger "Flower" class. The Flowers were the first ships designed as minesweepers. Like all the Flowers, the Aubrietia class were originally designed as single-screw fleet sweeping vessels, with triple hulls at the bows and an above-water magazine located aft, to give extra protection against loss from mine damage when working. However, the greatest utility was to be as a convoy escort; and, as such, other classes took over the minesweeping role. The Aubrietias were re-classified as convoy sloops. HMIS Cornwallis of this class was used by the RIN from 1921 to 1946, when it was decommissioned.

The P class, nominally classified as "patrol boats", was in effect a class of coastal sloops. Twenty-four ships to this design were ordered in May 1915 (numbered P.11 to P.34), and another thirty between February and June 1916 (numbered P.35 to P.64), under the Emergency War Programme for the Royal Navy in the First World War. In December 1916, ten of the latter group were altered on the stocks before launch for use as decoy Q-ships and were renumbered as PC-class sloops. Although usually not named, in 1925 P.38 was given the name Spey, as well as HMIS Baluchi and HMIS Pathan, the two P-class sloops used by the RIN.

The Grimsby class was a class of 13 sloops-of-war laid down between 1933 and 1940. Eight were built in the United Kingdom for the Royal Navy, four in Australia for the Royal Australian Navy, and one, HMIS Indus, for the RIN.

The Black Swan and Modified Black Swan were two classes of sloops of the Royal Navy and RIN.  Twelve Black Swans were launched between 1939 and 1943, including four for the RIN. Twenty-five Modified Black Swans were launched between 1942 and 1945, including two for the RIN. Several other ships were cancelled.

The Hastings class, also known as Folkestone class, was a class of five sloops built for the Royal Navy and the RIN in the interwar period, which went on to see service in the Second World War.  of this class served in the RIN.

Other sloops

Frigates
They were later transferred to Pakistan during partition. Later, several more frigates of the River class were commissioned. Of these, the Nilgiri-class frigates, commissioned between 1972 and 1981, were the first home-grown frigates in Indian service. The last ship of the Nilgiri class, was decommissioned in 2013.

The River class was a class of 151 frigates launched between 1941 and 1944 for use as anti-submarine convoy escorts in the North Atlantic. The majority served with the Royal Navy (RN) and Royal Canadian Navy (RCN), with some serving in other Allied navies: the Royal Australian Navy (RAN), the Free French Navy (FFN), the Royal Netherlands Navy and, post-war, the South African Navy (SAN). Eight ships of this class served in the RIN.

The Type 14 Blackwood was a ship class of minimal "second-rate" anti-submarine warfare frigates.  Built for the Royal Navy, to supplement the Type 12 class, during the 1950s at a time of increasing threat from the Soviet Union's submarine fleet, they served until the late 1970s.  Twelve ships of this class served with the Royal Navy and a further three were built for the Indian Navy.

The Type 12 or Whitby class was a six-ship class of anti-submarine frigates of the British Royal Navy, which entered service late in the 1950s. They were designed in the early 1950s as first-rate ocean-going convoy escorts, in the light of experience gained during the Second World War. At the time, the Royal Navy were designing single-role escorts and the Whitbys were designed as fast convoy escorts capable of tackling high-speed submarines. However, this made the Whitbys more sophisticated and expensive to produce in large numbers in the event of a major war. Although themselves rapidly outdated, the Type 12 proved to be an excellent basis for a series of frigate designs used by the British and Commonwealth navies for the next 20 years. Two ships from this class served in the Indian Navy.

The Type 41 or Leopard class was a class of anti-aircraft defence frigates built for the Royal Navy (4 ships) and Indian Navy (3 ships) in the 1950s.

The Nilgiri class are updated versions of the Leander class, designed and built for the Indian Navy by Mazagon Dock Limited in Mumbai. Six ships were built between 1972 and 1981. Vessels of the class formed the 14th Frigate Squadron. The lead ship, was the first major warship to be built in India, in collaboration with Yarrow Shipbuilders of the United Kingdom. The class and the ships are named for hill ranges of India. With the entry into service of the  Shivalik class, the Nilgiri class has been decommissioned by the navy, five ships having been decommissioned, with one having been sunk in an accident. INS Taragiri was the last ship of the class to be decommissioned, on 27 June 2013 in Mumbai, after serving 33 years in the navy.

The Leander-class, or Type 12I frigates, comprising twenty-six vessels, was among the most numerous and long-lived classes of frigates in the modern history of the Royal Navy. The class was built in three batches between 1959 and 1973. , formerly HMS Andromeda, from Batch 3A, served in the Indian Navy.

The Godavari-class frigates (formerly Type 16 or Project 16 frigates) were guided-missile frigates of the Indian Navy. The Godavari class was the first significant indigenous warship design-and-development initiative of the Indian Navy. The class and the ships took their names from Indian rivers. INS Gomati was the first Indian Navy vessel to employ digital electronics in her combat data system. The ships combined Indian, Russian, and Western weapons systems. The last of the class in service, INS Gomati, was decommissioned on 28 May 2022.

Future ships
A total of eleven ships from two different projects, Project 17A and Admiral Grigorovich classes, are expected to be commissioned into the Indian Navy. Most of these ships are under construction .

The Project 17A-class frigate is a follow-on of the Project 17 Shivalik-class frigate for the Indian Navy. A total of seven ships will be built at Mazagon Dock and GRSE. The first ship is expected to start construction by early 2017 and to be launched by 2020.

The Admiral Grigorovich'' class is a variant of the Russian-built Talwar''-class frigate in service with the Indian Navy . Six of this class were planned for service with the Russian Navy, with the engines to be supplied by the Ukrainian government-owned firm Zorya-Mashproekt. Of the first batch of three frigates, two vessels are in service with Russia , with the last to be commissioned in 2016. The 2014 Crimean crisis halted any further cooperation between the Russian and Ukrainian governments, leaving the second batch of three ships without engines. In August 2016, Russia agreed to sell the second batch of frigates to India. India will likely be able to acquire Ukrainian-built engines on its own. The frigates remain under construction, and it is possible the hulls could be transported to India for their final fitting-out, including the installation of their engines.

See also
 List of active Indian Navy ships
 Future of the Indian Navy
 List of ships of the Indian Navy
 List of submarines of the Indian Navy
 List of destroyers of the Indian Navy

Notes
Footnotes

Citations

References

Further reading

External links
 Official website of the Indian Navy

India
Frigates
Frigates